British Rail Class D3/11 was a locomotive commissioned by the Great Western Railway, but delivered to its successor British Rail in England. It was a diesel powered locomotive in the pre-TOPS period.

Statistics
Great Western number range: 502-507 (not carried)
BR 1948 number range: 15101-15106 	
Former class codes: D3/11, later 3/11 	
Built by: BR Swindon
Years introduced: 1948 	
Wheel arrangement: 0-6-0 	
Weight: 46 long tons 9 cwt 	
Height: 12 ft 5⅝ in 	
Length: 29 ft 1½ in 	
Width:  	
Wheelbase:  	
Wheel diameter: 4 ft 0½ in 	
Min curve negotiable: 3½ chains 	
Engine type: English Electric 6KT 	
Engine output:  	
Power at rail:  	
Tractive effort:  	
Cylinder bore: 10 in 	
Cylinder stroke: 12 in 	
Maximum speed:  	
Brake type: Air on loco, no train brakes 	
Route availability: 5	
Heating type: Not fitted 	
Multiple coupling type: Not fitted 	
Main generator type: EE801B 	
Aux generator type: EE?? 	
Traction motor type: EE506B
No of traction motors: 2
Gear ratio: 21.7:1 	
Fuel tank capacity: 659 gal 	
Cooling water capacity: 140 gal
Lub oil capacity: 65 gal 	
Sanding equipment: Pneumatic

References

See also
 GWR diesel shunters
 List of British Rail classes

D003.11
C locomotives
Railway locomotives introduced in 1948
Scrapped locomotives
Standard gauge locomotives of Great Britain
Diesel-electric locomotives of Great Britain